Ezo County is an administrative area in Western Equatoria State, South Sudan.

References

Western Equatoria
Counties of South Sudan